The Aerts (also spelled Aarts) was a Dutch automobile manufactured in 1899; a small number of cars are known to have been built at Dongen, but little else seems to be known about the marque.

The manufacturer also advertised as "Neerlandia, the first Dutch car", although "Groninger" and Eysink were earlier.

References
"Autodesign in Nederland" by Jan Lammerse

Veteran vehicles
Car manufacturers of the Netherlands
Dongen
Dutch companies established in 1899
Vehicle manufacturing companies established in 1899